Paraglaciecola chathamensis is a Gram-negative, strictly aerobic, chemoheterotrophic and motile bacterium from the genus of Paraglaciecola which has been isolated from sediments from the Pacific Ocean.

References

External links
Type strain of Paraglaciecola chathamensis at BacDive -  the Bacterial Diversity Metadatabase

Bacteria described in 2006
Alteromonadales